Dr. Ali Moustafa Mosharafa (11 July 1898 – 16 January 1950) was an Egyptian theoretical physicist. He was professor of applied mathematics in the Faculty of Science at Cairo University, and also served as its first dean. He contributed to the development of the quantum theory as well as the theory of relativity.

Biography

Birth and early life 

He was the youngest student in his class, but the most knowledgeable. He obtained his primary certificate in 1910 ranking second nationwide. At the age of 16, he obtained his Baccalaureate in 1914 to become the youngest student at that time to be awarded such a certificate, also ranking second. He preferred to enroll in the Teachers' College rather than the faculties of Medicine or Engineering due to his deep interest in mathematics.

He graduated in 1917. Due to his excellence in mathematics, the Egyptian Ministry of Education sent him to England where he obtained BSc (Honors) from the University of Nottingham, 1920. The Egyptian University consented to grant Mosharafa another scholarship to complete his doctoral thesis. During his stay in London, many of his scientific researches were published in prominent science magazines. He obtained a PhD in 1923 from King's College London in the shortest possible time permissible according to the regulations there. In 1924 Mosharafa was awarded the degree of Doctor of Science, the first Egyptian and 11th scientist in the entire world to obtain such a degree.

Academic career 

He became a teacher in the Higher Teachers' college in Cairo University, he became an associate professor of mathematics in the Faculty of Science because he was under the age of 30, the minimum age required for fulfilling the post of a professor. In 1926 his promotion to professor was raised in the Parliament, then chaired by Saad Zaghloul. The Parliament lauded his qualifications and merits which surpassed those of the English dean of the faculty and he was promoted to professor.

He was the first Egyptian professor of applied mathematics in the Faculty of Science. He became dean of the faculty in 1936, at the age of 38. He remained in office as a dean of the Faculty of Science until he died in 1950.

Scientific achievements 
Over the 1920s-1930s, he studied Maxwell's equations and the special relativity and he had correspondence with Albert Einstein.

Mosharafa published 25 original papers in distinguished scientific journals about quantum theory, the theory of relativity, and the relation between radiation and matter. He published around 12 scientific books about relativity and mathematics. His books, on the theory of relativity, were translated into English, French, German and Polish. He also translated 10 books of astronomy and mathematics into Arabic.

Musharafa was interested in the history of science, especially in studying the contributions of Arab scientists in the Middle Ages. With his student M. Morsi Ahmad, he published al-Khwārizmī's book The Compendious Book on Calculation by Completion and Balancing (Kitab al-Jabr wa-l-Muqabala).

He also was interested in the relation between music and mathematics and helped to establish the Egyptian society of music fans in 1945.

Social and political views 

He was the first to call for social reform and development based on scientific research. He was keen on disseminating public scientific awareness and wrote several articles and books for the public about science in simple forms. He, further, encouraged translations into Arabic. He contributed in writing the Arab scientific encyclopedia and books on the scientific heritage of the Arabs as well. He was against the use of atomic energy in war and warned against the exploitation of science as a means of destruction.

Honors 

 He was given the title "Pasha" by King Farouq, but he declined the title claiming that no title is worthier than a sciences PhD.
 A laboratory and an auditorium are named after him in the Faculty of Science, Cairo University, Egypt.
 An annual award carrying his name has been initiated by his family to be given to the cleverest student in mathematics.
 Egypt & Europe Magazine published a cartoon of him standing between Russia and the USA holding in his hands rolled paper, and both superpowers awaiting him to unfold the secrets of science. ??? 
 In 1947 the Institute for Advanced Study invited Mosharafa to join as a visiting professor at Princeton University, but the king disapproved.
 The Newton-Mosharafa Fund was named after him and after Sir Isaac Newton

Books and papers 
He wrote 26 significant papers including theoretical explanations of natural phenomena. He wrote 15 books on relativity and mathematics. Among which is a book on the theory of relativity translated into English, French, German and Polish. It was reprinted in the USA. He produced around 15 scientific books about relativity, mathematics, atom and space invasion. His most important books are:
 We and Science
 Science and Life
 Atom and Atomic Bomb
 Scientific Claims
 Engineering in Pharaohs Times

Papers

Some of His papers
 
On the Stark Effect for Strong Electric Fields (Phil. Mag. Vol. 44, p. 371) - (1922)
On the Quantum Theory of Complex Zeeman Effect (Phil. Mag. Vol. 46, p. 177) - (1923)
 
The Stark Effect for Strong Fields (Phil. Mag. Vol. 46, p. 751) - (1923)
On the Quantum Theory of the Simple Zeeman Effect (Roy. Soc. Proc. A. Vol. 102, p. 529) - (1923)
Half Integral Quantum numbers in the Theory of Stark Effect and a general Hypothesis of Fractional Quantum numbers (Roy. Soc. Proc. Vol. 126, p. 641) - (1930)
On The Quantum Dynamics of Degenerate Systems (Roy. Soc. Proc. A. Vol. 107, p. 237) - (1925)
The Quantum Explanation of the Zeeman Triplet (Nature Vol. 119, p. 96, No. 2907, July 18) - (1925)
The Motion of a Lorentz Electron as a wave Phenomenon (Nature Vol. 124, p. 726, No. 3132, Nov. 9) - (1929)
Wave Mechanics and the Dual Aspect of Matter and Radiation (Roy. Soc. Proc. A. Vol. 126, p. 35) - (1930)
Material and Radiational Waves (Roy. Soc. Proc. A. Vol. 131, p. 335) - (1931)
Can Matter and Radiation be regarded as two aspects of the same world-Condition (Verhandlungen der Internationalen Kongress, Zurich, Switzerland) - (1932)
Some Views on the Relation between Matter and Radiation (Bulletin de l'institute d'Egypte, T. XVI, p. 161) - (1939)
 
The Maxwellian Equations and a Variable Speed of Light (Proceedings of the Mathematical and Physical Society of Egypt, No. 1, Vol. 1) - (1937)
The Principle of Indeterminacy and the Structure of the World Lines (Proceedings of the Mathematical and Physical Society of Egypt, Vol. 2, No. 1) - (1944)
Wave Surfaces associated with World Lines (Proceedings of the Mathematical and Physical Society of Egypt, Vol. 2, No. 2) - (1943)
Conical Transformations  (Proceedings of the Mathematical and Physical Society of Egypt, No. 2, Vol. 3) - (1944)
On a Positive Definite Metric in the Special Theory of Relativity (Proceedings of the Mathematical and Physical Society of Egypt, Vol. 2, No. 4) - (1944)
On the Metric of Space and the Equations of Motion of a Charged Particle (Proceedings of the Mathematical and Physical Society of Egypt, Vol. 3, No. 1) - (1945)
 
The Metric of Space and Mass Deficiency (Philosophical Magazine) - (1948)

References

References of his Papers 
 
 
 
 
 
 
 
 

1898 births
1950 deaths
Alumni of King's College London
Academic staff of Cairo University
Egyptian scientists
Egyptian physicists
Relativity theorists
Alumni of the University of Nottingham
Egyptian pashas